Trunk roads in Wales were created in the Trunk Roads Act of 1936  when the UK Ministry of Transport took direct control over 30 of the principal roads in Great Britain from English, Welsh and Scottish local authorities. The number of trunk roads was increased from 30 to 101 in the Trunk Roads Act of 1946. These roads formed what the Act called "the national system of routes for through traffic". Since Welsh devolution the trunk road system in Wales has been managed by the South Wales Trunk Road Agent and the North and Mid Wales Trunk Road Agent on behalf of the Welsh Government.

Historically, trunk roads have been listed on maps with a "(T)" after their number, to distinguish them from non-trunk parts of the same road. However, this suffix is no longer included on current Ordnance Survey maps. The North and Mid Wales Trunk Road Agent still use it to distinguish the trunk road from a non-trunk road. When a trunk road had been improved by a motorway, bypass or a similar route, it may be de-trunked. When a road is de-trunked, signposts are often replaced, and sometimes route numbers are changed, making the original road harder to follow. The London–Fishguard Trunk Road in 1936 only included the A48 and the A40. With road improvements, most notably the M4 motorway, much of both the A48 and the A40 has been de-trunked

Under UK Parliamentary control
The 1936 Act came into force in Wales on 1 April 1937 and created 30 trunk roads in Great Britain, with 5 roads either completely or partially within Wales. The Act excluded roads in the County of London and Northern Ireland. The 1946 Act came into force in Wales on 1 April 1946 and produced a further 71 with 11 either completely or partially within Wales. This Act included roads within the County of London, but still excluded the City of London.

A review of roads was carried out in 1997–98 by the Welsh Office which was part of the Government of the United Kingdom. It reviewed the existing trunk road network and identified routes that were of national strategic importance. The factors for deciding which routes should be retained in the core (trunk) network included:

Providing links between main centres of population, industry, tourist areas and important communities.
Promoting safe, secure, predictable, and rapid movement of people and goods throughout Wales.
Providing access to major seaports, airports, rail and bus terminals.
Providing cross-border links to the English network
Being part of the UK Trans-European road network. 

These factors were published in the Government's white paper "A New Deal for Transport" in July 1998.

Under Welsh Parliamentary control

The National Assembly for Wales took responsibility for devolved powers on 1 July 1999, as part of this process, transport was transferred from the Parliament of the United Kingdom to the National Assembly for Wales and with it responsibility for the trunk road network, including motorways. Responsibility for the management of highways in Wales is split between the Welsh Government and local highway agencies. The Welsh Government is responsible for trunk roads and motorways, whilst the 22 local authorities are responsible for all other highways.

In 2001 the Welsh Government reviewed the way in which trunk roads and motorways were being managed, and by September 2004, they had decided to reduce the number of trunk road agencies from eight down to three. The three new agencies were:
The South Wales Trunk Road Agency (SWTRA), later renamed the South Wales Trunk Road Agent
The Mid Wales Trunk Road Agency (MWTRA)
The North Wales Trunk Road Agency (NWTRA).

The three new Trunk Road Agencies started on 1 April 2006. Six years later on 1 April 2012 these were again reduced further down to two:
The South Wales Trunk Road Agent, who manage 16 trunk roads or parts of roads (both A roads and motorways)
The North and Mid Wales Trunk Road Agent (NMWTRA), who manage 11 trunk roads or parts of roads (all A roads).

Neath Port Talbot County Borough Council and Gwynedd Council manage and maintain the trunk road network on behalf of the Transport and Strategic Regeneration division of the Welsh Government for SWTRA and NMWTRA respectively.

In March 2002, the Welsh Government developed their Trunk Road Forward Programme. The programme listed plans for major improvements and new road schemes.
Following the 2004 review of the Welsh Government's transport policy in 2004, they updated the list for major improvements and new road schemes. In December 2008 the Trunk Road Forward Programme was again updated due to the pledges made in the One Wales the Labour Party and Plaid Cymru.

Present-day trunk roads

See also
Trunk road
Trunk road agent
Roads in the United Kingdom
Transport in the United Kingdom
List of motorways in the United Kingdom

References

External links
Trunk Road Forward Programme March 2002
Trunk Road Forward Programme 2004 Supplement
Trunk Road Forward Programme November 2009

Road transport in Wales
Roads in Wales